Joseph Russell Bailey, 1st Baron Glanusk (7 April 1840 – 6 January 1906), known as Sir Joseph Bailey, 2nd Baronet, from 1858 to 1899, was a Welsh Conservative Member of Parliament.

Early Life

Born at Leamington Spa, he was the son of Joseph Bailey, eldest son of the ironmaster Sir Joseph Bailey, 1st Baronet, and his wife, the eldest daughter of William Congreve Russell. He succeeded his grandfather as second Baronet, of Glanusk Park, in 1858.

Career
On 14 February 1861 he was commissioned as a Lieutenant in the part-time 3rd (Crickhowell) Brecknockshire Rifle Volunteer Corps. On 15 May 1867 his company commander was promoted to command the 1st Administrative Battalion, Brecknockshire Rifle Volunteer Corps, and on the same day Bailey was appointed the battalion's first Honorary Colonel. He retained the position with the unit's successor, the 1st (Brecknockshire) Volunteer Battalion, South Wales Borderers, until his death, when he was succeeded by his eldest son. He was awarded the Volunteer Decoration.

In 1864, he served as High Sheriff of Brecknockshire. In 1865 he was elected to the British House of Commons for Herefordshire, a seat he held until 1885 when the constituency was abolished, and then represented Hereford between 1886 and 1892. He also served as Lord Lieutenant of Brecknockshire from 1875 to 1905. In 1899, he was raised to the peerage as Baron Glanusk, of Glanusk Park in the County of Brecknock.

Family
He married Mary Ann, daughter of Henry Lucas, MD, on 9 April 1861, and they had the following children:
 Hon Elizabeth Mabel Bailey, born 16 March 1862, Justice of the peace
 Hon Joseph Henry Russell Bailey, born 26 October 1864, Major, Grenadier Guards, served in Second Boer War and World War I
 Hon Edith Bailey, born 18 February 1866, married 20 April 1892 Samuel Hood Cowper-Coles, died 22 February 1933
 Hon William Bailey, born 28 August 1867, 11th Hussars, served in North West Frontier Expedition 1897, Major Welsh Horse Yeomanry in World War I, died 24 December 1942
 Hon Arthur Bailey,born 3 December 1868, Captain East African Mounted Rifles, served in Second Boer War and World War I, died 19 January 1929
 Cecile Mary Bailey, born 25 March, died 2 November 1870
 Hon Herbert Crawshay Bailey, born 23 June 1871, Barrister-at-Law, served in World War I, died 13 April 1936, father of 4th Baron Glanusk
 Hon Margaret Elinor Bailey, born 28 October 1878
 Hon Gwladys Mary Bailey, born 29 March 1875
 Hon John Lancelot Bailey, born 2 December 1878, Captain South Wales Borderers, served in World War I, died 26 October 1918
 
Lord Glanusk died in January 1906, aged 65, and was succeeded in his titles by his eldest son Joseph Bailey, 2nd Baron Glanusk. Lady Glanusk died in 1935.

Coat of arms

Notes

References 
 Burke's Peerage, Baronetage and Knightage, 100th Edn, London, 1953.
 Robert P. Dod, The Peerage, Baronetage and Knightage of Great Britain and Ireland, London: Whitaker & Co, 1860.
Kidd, Charles, Williamson, David (editors). Debrett's Peerage and Baronetage (1990 edition). New York: St Martin's Press, 1990,

External links 
 

1840 births
1906 deaths
Barons in the Peerage of the United Kingdom
Lord-Lieutenants of Brecknockshire
Bailey, Joseph Russell
Bailey, Joseph Russell
Bailey, Joseph Russell
Bailey, Joseph Russell
Bailey, Joseph Russell
Bailey, Joseph Russell
UK MPs who were granted peerages
High Sheriffs of Brecknockshire
South Wales Borderers officers
Welsh landowners
Peers of the United Kingdom created by Queen Victoria
19th-century British businesspeople